First Congregational Church of Los Angeles is located at 540 South Commonwealth Avenue, Los Angeles, California, United States. It is a member of the United Church of Christ.  Founded in 1867, the church is the city's oldest continuous Protestant congregation. The congregation moved around using a variety of buildings until it moved to its current location in 1932, with the first service being held on March 13, 1932.

The current building is an impressive English Gothic Revival-style designed by Los Angeles' architects James Edward Allison & David Clark Allison, the massive concrete structure was reinforced with more than 500 tons of steel. Its dominant feature is a tower soaring 157 feet and weighing 30,000 tons. There are four three-ton pinnacles at the corners of the tower rise another nineteen feet. Supported by more than 150 caissons extending up to forty-five feet into the bedrock. The church is claimed to house the world's second largest church organ.

On March 15, 2002, the church was designated a Historic-Cultural Monument by the Los Angeles Cultural Heritage Commission.

Organ
The church has the world's second largest church organ although, similar to the instrument at St. Stephen's Cathedral, Passau (five organs, one console), it is really two separate organs playing from twin consoles. A Skinner organ, built in 1931, is in the front of the building and a Schlicker (of Buffalo, New York) in the rear balcony. Today the organs play some 20,000 pipes with five manuals, 346 ranks, 233 registers, and 265 stops although it is continually being enlarged. Current caretaker/technician- Scott Clowes 2010–present. Recordings of this instrument appear on Telarc and Delos labels.

Media
The church has been a popular location for commercials, films, music videos, and television shows.

Commercials

Film

Music Videos

Television

References

External links

Churches in Los Angeles
Allison & Allison buildings